The 2023 Urawa Red Diamonds season is their 73rd season in existence and the 23rd consecutive season in the J1 League. In addition to the league, the club competes in the Emperor's Cup and the J. League Cup. The club can still qualify to the 2023–24 AFC Champions League if they win their 2022 AFC Champions League Final, to be played on July 2023.

Players

Out on loan

Transfers

Competitions

Overall record

Pre-season friendlies

J1 League 

The club finished mid-table last season, at the 9th place.

League table

Results summary

Results by round

Matches 
The full league fixtures were released on 20 January 2023.

Emperor's Cup 
The club will start the competition at the second round.

J.League Cup 

The club started the competition at the group stage.

Goalscorers 
Updated as of 11 March 2023.

References

External links 
 Official website 

Urawa Red Diamonds seasons
Urawa Red Diamonds